The Carmel River (Rumsen: tirus ua čorx) is a  river on the Central Coast of California in Monterey County that originates in the Ventana Wilderness of the Santa Lucia Mountains. The river flows northwest through Carmel Valley with its mouth at the Pacific Ocean south of Carmel-by-the-Sea, at Carmel Bay. The Carmel River is considered the northern boundary of Big Sur, the other boundaries being San Carpóforo Creek and the Pacific coastline.

History
Before European first contact, the Indigenous peoples of the Carmel River watershed were the Rumsen Ohlone people in the lower watershed, and the Esselen people of the upper watershed. Both peoples were taken into the Carmel Mission.

The mouth of Carmel Valley where the Carmel River runs into Carmel Bay was first seen by Spanish explorer Sebastián Vizcaíno shortly before he landed in Monterey Bay in December 1602. He wrote about visiting the river on January 3, 1603, but greatly exaggerated its proportions, confusing later explorers. Vizcaino named it El Rio del Carmelo, likely because his voyage was accompanied by three Carmelite friars.

Later that winter the local springs near Monterey froze, and the explorers had to cross the peninsula to find freshwater.  Fathers Junípero Serra and Juan Crespí moved Mission San Carlos Borromeo de Carmelo from Monterey to its present site by the Carmel River in 1771, they directed Indian laborers to dig ditches from the Carmel River to water their crops. The river has supplied ranchers and residents ever since.

After railroad baron Charles Crocker built the Hotel Del Monte, he commissioned construction of a Dam in 1883 on the upper river near present-day Cachagua. It supplied 400 acre-feet of water annually to the hotel.

In his 1945 novel Cannery Row John Steinbeck wrote "The Carmel is a lovely little river. It isn't very long but in its course it has everything a river should have."

Watershed

The Sierra de Salinas range forms the northeastern divide of the watershed and the northern terminus of the Santa Lucia Mountains forms the southwestern divide. Approximately 96% of the Carmel River flows from the many tributaries in the Santa Lucia Mountains, including San Clemente Creek and Cachagua Creek subwatersheds. In contrast, the combined flow from the Tularcitos, Rana, and Chupines subwatersheds of the Sierra de Salinas produces only 4% of the annual discharge of the Carmel River, but occupies 23% of the entire watershed.

The major tributaries, beginning upstream, are Carmel River-Miller Fork (right), Cachagua Creek (right), Pine Creek (left), Tularcitos Creek (right), and Las Garzas Creek (left).

Ecology

The river flows through various habitats beyond its bankside riparian zone: starting in mixed evergreen forests at higher elevations, including coast redwoods (Sequoia sempervirens), Coast Douglas fir (Pseudotsuga menziesii var. menziesii) and rare Santa Lucia firs (Abies bracteata) the most endemic fir in North America. At middle elevations the Carmel River flows down through montane chaparral and woodlands, and at lower elevations, to remnant coastal sage and chaparral and coastal prairie, concluding through minor coastal sand dunes at its Pacific mouth.

Stream restoration and conservation projects are proceeding to return/enhance migrating fish in the family Salmonidae, such as the steelhead trout (Oncorhynchus mykiss), and other aquatic and terrestrial flora and fauna to the Carmel River ecosystem. Carmel River steelhead trout are part of the South-Central California Coast Steelhead (SCCCS) distinct population segment (DPS) and listed as threatened under the Endangered Species Act. Removal of the San Clemente Dam via a bypass has removed a partial barrier to steelhead spawning runs and replenished the river below the dam with gravels essential for spawning. The Carmel River supports the largest run of about 27 streams utilized by steelhead trout in the entire South-Central California Coast DPS region. in normal and above water years, adult steelhead can potentially spawn in a total of 73.7 miles of stream, including 28.7 miles of the Carmel River main stem, 34.3 miles of primary tributaries, and 10.8 miles of secondary tributaries. However, Los Padres Dam remains a barrier to steelhead trout in- and out-migration. For passage around Los Padres for adult spawning runs, there is a fish trap at the base of the dam where adults are collected and trucked above the dam and released into the reservoir. For outgoing juveniles/smolts, there is a chute/pipe they are herded into to get them out of the reservoir and into the river downstream of the dam that is operated by NOAA Fisheries. A recent 2022 study has also shown that there is poor downstream passage at the Los Padres Dam which creates an ecological trap for migrating steelhead trout. The steelhead can ascend the fish ladder and spawn above the Los Padres Reservoir but a truncated hydroperiod and low flows limit successfully outmigration back to the ocean.

Another federally threatened species, the California red-legged frog (Rana draytonii) is native to the river.

The Hastings Natural History Reserve lies where Big Creek and Robertson Creek merge to form the Finch Creek tributary to Cachagua Creek, which is, in turn, tributary to the Carmel River mainstem. It is located off Carmel Valley Road just above Jamesburg, California and is a 2,500-acre Biological Field Station of the University of California, Berkeley Museum of Vertebrate Zoology and Natural Reserve System.

Dams and reservoirs
The Carmel River had three dams, with their reservoirs used for drinking water and having severe sediment buildup. It was the second of three dams built on the Carmel River, preceded by the Old Carmel River Dam built in the 1880s and followed by the Los Padres Dam in 1949.

In January 2010 an agreement was reached with the California American Water Company to dig a new half-mile channel to bypass and strand the sediment behind the dam at a cost of $84 million, beginning in 2013. The CRRDR opened up  of historic steelhead rainbow trout habitat on the river mainstem, plus access to three named tributary creeks: San Clemente Creek, Pine Creek and Cachagua Creek. At the time it was the third largest dam removal in North America, and the largest dam removal in a Mediterranean hydroclimate setting.

The Los Padres Reservoir is steadily filling with sediment, as the pervasively fractured granitic and metamorphic rock underlying the Carmel River watershed are easily eroded. Sediment loads may greatly increase when fires reduce vegetation cover and are followed by large rainfall events, as in the 1977 Marble Cone Fire that produced catastrophic debris flows. Los Padres dam and reservoir are an impediment to natural flow of woody debris and gravel/sediment downstream, and to steelhead trout migration. However, it also serves an aesthetic function by ensuring summer flow through many miles of river below the dam each summer.

It was removed as part of the San Clemente Dam Removal Project. This first dam and associated pipeline was constructed ca. 1880 by Charles Crocker and the Pacific Improvement Company with a labor force that included approximately 700 Chinese workers. This small dam, which has been referred to as the "Chinese Dam" and "Old Carmel River Dam," was built using hewn and mortared granite blocks. Remnants of the original iron pipe still exist along Carmel Valley Road, but no records have been found to show where the pipe crossed the river.

See also
Carmel Bay State Marine Conservation Area
Hydrological transport model
List of rivers of California

References

Further reading

California Department of Boating and Waterways
California Coastal Conservancy: Carmel River

External links

Carmel River Watershed Conservancy website
Resource Conservation District of Monterey County
Carmel River Basin Relief Map
Carmel River Steelhead Association: Carmel River photograph gallery
Video "New Life for the Carmel River" June 2013 California American Water
San Clemente Dam Removal & Carmel River Reroute Project
 http://www.carmelsteelhead.org/

Rivers of Monterey County, California
Santa Lucia Range
Monterey Ranger District, Los Padres National Forest
Rivers of Northern California